The Gene Autry Show is an American western/cowboy television series which aired for 91 episodes on CBS from July 23, 1950 until August 7, 1956, originally sponsored by Wrigley's Doublemint chewing gum.

Overview

Series star Gene Autry had already established his singing cowboy character on radio and films. Now he and his horse Champion were featured in a weekly television series of western adventures. Gene's role changed almost weekly from rancher, to ranch hand, to sheriff, to border agent, etc.  Gene's usual comic relief and sidekick, Pat, was played by Pat Buttram.  During the first season, Gene's sidekick was played by Chill Wills twice (as Chill) and by Fuzzy Knight four times (as Sagebrush). Alan Hale, Jr. played a bad guy in several episodes of Seasons 1 and 2, but he also played Gene's sidekick, Tiny, in two episodes of Season 1.

By this time, Autry had established his own production company, Flying 'A' Productions, and acted as executive director for the series.

The series lasted five seasons. The first four were in black and white, and the final season (thirteen episodes) was in color.  Color was experimented with in two episodes of the first season. The theme song Back In the Saddle Again was written by Autry and Ray Whitley and sung by Autry.

Among the guest stars, Nan Leslie and Mike Ragan were cast in different roles four times from 1950 to 1955.

Dick Jones was cast in ten episodes of The Gene Autry Show and acted in two other Flying A Productions, The Range Rider and Buffalo Bill, Jr..

Spin-off
The Gene Autry Show had a 26-episode prime-time spin-off called The Adventures of Champion in 1955-1956.

Ewing Mitchell appeared seven times on The Gene Autry Show and seven times as well on The Adventures of Champion in the latter as Sheriff Powers.

Home media
Timeless Media Group has released all five seasons on DVD in Region 1, fully restored and uncut.

On December 10, 2013, Timeless Media released ''The Gene Autry Show- The Complete series.

References

External links
 
Behind-the-scenes production photos Collection of Stephen Lodge.

1950 American television series debuts
1956 American television series endings
Black-and-white American television shows
CBS original programming
English-language television shows
1950s Western (genre) television series
Gene Autry